Authaeretis is a genus of moths of the family Crambidae.

Species
Authaeretis eridora Meyrick, 1886
Authaeretis exaereta Tams, 1935

References

Pyraustinae
Crambidae genera
Taxa named by Edward Meyrick